The 2002 European Fencing Championships were held in Moscow. The event took place from 3 to 8 June 2002.

Medal summary

Men's events

Women's events

Medal table

References 
 Results at the European Fencing Confederation

2002
European Fencing Championships
European Fencing Championships
2002 in Moscow
Sports competitions in Moscow
International fencing competitions hosted by Russia
June 2002 sports events in Europe